Innocence is a 2013 American horror drama film directed by Hilary Brougher, who co-wrote the film with Tristine Skyler. The movie is based on the 2000 novel of the same name by Jane Mendelsohn. It had its world premiere on October 26, 2013 at the Austin Film Festival and received a limited theatrical release in the United States on September 5, 2014. The movie stars Sophie Curtis, Kelly Reilly, Graham Phillips, Linus Roache, Sarah Sutherland and Stephanie March.

Plot
Beckett (Sophie Curtis) is a young teenager mourning the loss of her mother. She's moved to the Upper West Side of Manhattan with her father Miles (Linus Roache) and is set to begin school at Hamilton, an exclusive prep school. Beckett is so engrossed in her grief that she fails to notice that her school is a little stranger than most schools, as its students are prone to suicides and is full of extraordinarily beautiful female teachers. Things grow worse when the school nurse Pamela (Kelly Reilly) decides to move in with Beckett and Miles, especially since Pamela keeps instructing Beckett to remain a virgin. What Beckett doesn't know is that Pamela and the other school staff are all incarnations of Lamia, a former queen of Libya, and must kill and drink the blood of virgins to retain their immortal existence.

Cast 
 Sophie Curtis as Beckett Warner
 Kelly Reilly as Pamela Hamilton
 Graham Phillips as Tobey Crawford
 Linus Roache as Miles Warner
 Sarah Sutherland as Jen Dunham
 Stephanie March as Natalie Crawford
 Perrey Reeves as Ava Dunham

Reception

Critical reception for Innocence has been predominantly negative. It holds an approval rating of 15% at Rotten Tomatoes, based on 20 reviews, with an average rating of 3.3/10. On Metacritic, the film has weighted average rating of 26 out of 100, based on 13 reviews, indicating "generally unfavorable reviews". The New York Times criticized the film's acting and soundtrack, while the Las Vegas Weekly criticized it for relying overly much on "worn-out horror cliches" - a criticism shared by the Fort Worth Star-Telegram.

References

External links 
 
 
 

2013 films
Films based on American horror novels
American vampire films
2013 horror films
2010s horror drama films
American horror drama films
Killer Films films
Films produced by Christine Vachon
Films scored by Tomandandy
2013 drama films
2010s English-language films
2010s American films